Harpalus nigritarsis is a species of ground beetle in the subfamily Harpalinae. It was described by C.R. Sahlberg in 1827.

References

nigritarsis
Beetles described in 1827